The 2012 Shandong Lunen Taishan F.C. season is Shandong's 19th consecutive season in the top division of Chinese football. Shandong will also be competing in the Chinese FA Cup.

Squad

Reserve squad

On loan

Transfers

Winter

In:

 

Out:

Summer

In:

Out:

Competitions

Chinese Super League

Results

League table

Chinese FA Cup

Squad statistics

Top scorers

References

Shandong Taishan F.C. seasons
Shandong Luneng Taishan F.C.